Hiroyuki Noake (born 24 August 1974) is a Japanese speed skater. He competed at the 1998 Winter Olympics and the 2002 Winter Olympics.

References

1974 births
Living people
Japanese male speed skaters
Olympic speed skaters of Japan
Speed skaters at the 1998 Winter Olympics
Speed skaters at the 2002 Winter Olympics
Sportspeople from Nagano Prefecture